Cercophonius kershawi, also known as the mallee wood scorpion, is a species of scorpion in the Bothriuridae family. It is native to south-eastern Australia, and was first described in 1930 by Australian paleontologist and Western Australian Museum curator Ludwig Glauert.

References

 

 
kershawi
Scorpions of Australia
Endemic fauna of Australia
Fauna of New South Wales
Fauna of South Australia
Victoria
Animals described in 1930
Taxa named by Ludwig Glauert